Hashim Ibrahim Awad (1952 – April 26, 2006) was a disabled Iraqi veteran killed by US Marines on the night of April 26, 2006, in an episode known as the Hamdania incident.  Seven Marines and a Navy corpsman face charges of war crimes in relation to his death, including murder, kidnapping, conspiracy, larceny, assault and unlawfully entering a dwelling. The men charged in his death are:

Navy Hospital Corpsman Third Class Melson J. Bacos
Sergeant Lawrence G. Hutchins III
Lance Corporal Tyler A. Jackson.
Private First Class John J. Jodka
Corporal Marshall L. Magincalda
Lance Corporal Robert B. Pennington
Lance Corporal Jerry E. Shumate Jr.
Corporal Trent D. Thomas

War injury
Hashim Ibrahim Awad was known as Hashim the Lame because of the metal bar that was surgically implanted in his leg. He had been injured in the war with Iran in the 1980s.  He also suffered from limited eyesight.

Allegations

Pressure to become an informer
According to family members, Awad was pressured by US military personnel to become an informant against the insurgency.  The area around Hamdania, a small village near Abu Ghraib prison, is an area of frequent insurgent attacks.  His family indicated that Awad refused to become an informer.

Early morning abduction and killing
According to family members, around 2:00am on the night of April 26, 2006, US Marines went house to house in the small village pounding on doors.  At the house of Awad's cousin's family they confiscated the family AK-47 (each family in Iraq is entitled to own one rifle), as well as a shovel.  When they arrived at Awad's house the Marines were seen pulling him out of the house by the arms without asking him any questions. Approximately 30 minutes later gunshots were heard.  In the morning the family was informed by local police that Hashim Ibrahim Awad had been shot in the face and left in a hole dug by the side of the road, with the AK-47 and shovel beside him as though he had been digging a hole to plant an IED.

See also
Human rights in post-Saddam Hussein Iraq
Hamdania incident

References

1952 births
2006 deaths
War crimes in Iraq